By Dawn's Early Light (also known as The Grand Tour) is an HBO original movie, first aired in 1990. It is based on the 1983 novel Trinity's Child, written by William Prochnau. The film is one of the last to depict the events of a fictional World War III before the collapse of the Soviet Union and the end of the Cold War.

Plot
In 1991, dissident officials in the Soviet Union launch a nuclear missile at Donetsk from a site in NATO member Turkey. The Soviet automated defense systems, believing that a NATO attack is in progress, execute a measured launch of intercontinental ballistic missiles (ICBMs) at the United States. After Donetsk is destroyed, the Strategic Air Command (SAC) scrambles its forces and SAC Commander General Renning urges the US president to authorize a large-scale counterattack. The Soviet leader explains the dissidents' actions to the US president. He asks the US to stand down, citing the two nations' improving relations, but he is willing to accept a US counterstrike comparable to the Soviets' strike, costing each side six to nine million people. If the United States launches an all-out attack, the Soviets will respond in kind and doom the whole planet.

As the president argues with General Renning, it is reported that the Soviets have launched a second attack. The president reluctantly authorizes a multi-part all-out attack, with US ICBMs launched immediately, then submarine-launched ballistic missiles (SLBMs) in a few hours, coincident with the arrival of US Air Force bombers over the Soviet Union. General Renning issues the orders just before the first wave of Soviet missiles hits SAC headquarters and passes command of SAC to "Alice," the codename of an Air Force general in command of Looking Glass, a flying command aircraft for the US Air Force. The president takes off in Marine One and learns the second Soviet attack was directed at China, since it had launched its own missiles against the Soviets. Realizing his mistake, the president tries to cancel the retaliation order, but before he can do this a nearby nuclear detonation forces his helicopter down.

A B-52 bomber, commanded by Major Cassidy and his co-pilot Captain Moreau, takes off with callsign "Polar Bear 1" moments before Fairchild Air Force Base is destroyed. The crewmen are shaken by the unfolding events; while fighting off Russian interceptors a nuclear flash partially blinds Moreau and the ensuing shock wave kills another crew member. The bomber proceeds into eastern Russia.

An American admiral, codenamed "Harpoon," is in command of Nightwatch, a presidential flying command platform. With the president presumed dead, they swear in the US Secretary of the Interior as president, codenamed "Condor." Harpoon briefs Condor regarding the Soviet president's message, the mistake regarding China, and the damage already done by the initial retaliation. Colonel Fargo, a hawkish advisor on Nightwatch, advises Condor to continue American strikes. Condor agrees with Fargo's plan for a submarine missile and bomber attack, overruling Harpoon's plea to negotiate a ceasefire, and orders Alice to execute the remainder of the attack plan. Cassidy and Moreau react emotionally to these orders and convince their crew to abort the mission. Crewman Tyler, despondent over the loss of his family at Fairchild, commits suicide by ejecting without a parachute, killing all the crew except the two pilots.

The original president is discovered badly injured at the crash site of Marine One and is taken to a FEMA emergency shelter where he learns of Condor's orders. He contacts the Soviet president and they agree to a one-hour stand off. Aboard Looking Glass, Alice notices that Polar Bear 1 has abandoned its attack and a Soviet squadron has apparently also turned back in response. Alice begs Condor to recall the rest of the US bombers so a ceasefire can be arranged. Condor instead orders Alice to send US Navy carrier-based fighters to shoot down Polar Bear 1. Alice hesitates and Fargo informs Condor that they can send the launch commands from Nightwatch. Condor cuts off communication with Looking Glass.

The original president contacts Alice, and Looking Glass agrees to recall the bombers but lacks the authority to call off the submarine attack. Two US Navy fighters intercept Polar Bear 1 over the Pacific Ocean to shoot it down, but when their aircraft carrier is sunk, they call off their attack and wish Polar Bear 1 good luck instead. The real president finally connects with Condor. Fearing he is an impersonator, Condor orders the Nightwatch staff to contact the US submarines and transmit launch orders. Alice and the Looking Glass staff decide to ram their plane into Nightwatch before Condor can send out launch orders, and the Nightwatch pilots sacrifice themselves by turning their aircraft into the path of Looking Glass. The real president successfully issues a stand-down message to the American forces as Cassidy and Moreau fly towards Hawaii, uncertain of whether their fuel will last long enough to reach the island, but relieved that the world has a future now.

Cast
 Powers Boothe as Major Cassidy, USAF – pilot of the B-52 bomber "Polar Bear 1"
 Rebecca De Mornay as Captain Moreau, USAF – copilot of "Polar Bear 1"  
 James Earl Jones as USAF general Charlie in command of the EC-135 "Looking Glass" – callsign "Alice" 
 Martin Landau as President of the United States
 Darren McGavin as US Secretary of the Interior on the Boeing E-4 NEACP aircraft – callsign "Condor" 
 Rip Torn as Colonel Fargo, USA – Army military advisor in the E-4
 Jeffrey DeMunn as USN admiral aboard the E-4 – callsign "Harpoon"
 Peter MacNicol as LCDR Tom Sedgwick, USN – President's Emergency War Orders officer
 Nicolas Coster as General Clay Renning, USAF, at SAC headquarters – callsign "Icarus"
 Ken Jenkins as a USAF Colonel Sam aboard Looking Glass
 Richard Speight Jr. as a USAF guard

Production
Principal photography took place from August 7 to late September 1989. The use of military hardware such as the B-52 bomber and Boeing E-4 enabled a realistic account of the Strategic Air Command in action.

Differences from the source material
There are two major differences between the plot of the novel and the film, the first being that the crisis in the novel is started by a deliberate Soviet attack to counter the US military buildup with which they are unable to compete. The other major difference in the film is the romantic subplot between Moreau and Cassidy, which is absent in the book; the characters there actually ridicule the idea of such a relationship between them.

Reception
Contemporary reviews of By Dawn's Early Light centered on the confrontation by nuclear powers and gave it accolades. "There never has been a made-for-cable movie as sleek and efficient as By Dawn's Early Light. Fast-moving, complex, and only occasionally a bit hokey, it's by far the best original movie project HBO has overseen." "Boasting high production values, okay special effects, and a surprisingly top-notch cast... a thrilling drama that is your better-than-average made-for-TV movie." More recent reviews were similar: "Probably the end of the line for Cold War confrontation on this scale, but compelling drama nonetheless."

Awards and honors
In 1990, James Earl Jones was nominated for an Emmy for Outstanding Supporting Actor in a Miniseries or a Special and Matte World Digital won for Outstanding Achievement in Special Visual Effects.

In addition, Martin Landau was nominated for the 1991 Cable Ace award for Best Supporting Actor in a Movie or Miniseries, but lost to his co-star from this film, James Earl Jones who won for Heat Wave.

See also
 Fail-Safe, a 1962 book and a 1964 film with similar themes 
 Red Alert, a 1958 novel

References

Notes

Citations

Bibliography

 Frietas, Gary A. War Movies: The Belle & Blade Guide to Classic War Videos. Bandon, Oregon: Robert D. Reed Publishers, 2011. .
 Lisboa, Maria Manuel. The End of the World: Apocalypse and Its Aftermath in Western Culture. Cambridge, UK: Open Book Publishers, 2011. . 
 Prochnau, William. Trinity's Child. London: Putnam Publishing Group, 1983. .

External links 
 
 
 

1990 television films
1990 films
1990s disaster films
1990s thriller drama films
1990 action thriller films
American aviation films
American disaster films
American thriller drama films
American war films
Cold War films
Disaster television films
Films about fictional presidents of the United States
Films about nuclear war and weapons
Films about the United States Air Force
Films based on American novels
Films based on military novels
Films based on science fiction novels
Films directed by Jack Sholder
Films set in 1991
HBO Films films
Strategic Air Command
Techno-thriller films
American thriller television films
Action television films
United States presidential succession in fiction
Films about World War III
Films set in Washington (state)
Films set in Washington, D.C.
American drama television films
1990s American films